Transcription factor p65 also known as nuclear factor NF-kappa-B p65 subunit is a protein that in humans is encoded by the RELA gene.

RELA, also known as p65, is a REL-associated protein involved in NF-κB heterodimer formation, nuclear translocation and activation . NF-κB is an essential transcription factor complex involved in all types of cellular processes, including cellular metabolism, chemotaxis, etc. Phosphorylation and acetylation of RELA are crucial post-translational modifications required for NF-κB activation. RELA has also been shown to modulate immune responses, and activation of RELA is positively associated with multiple types of cancer.

Gene and expression 

RELA, or v-rel avian reticuloendotheliosis viral oncogene homolog A, is also known as p65 or NFKB3. It is located on chromosome 11 q13, and its nucleotide sequence is 1473 nucleotide long. RELA protein has four isoforms, the longest and the predominant one being 551 amino acids. RELA is expressed alongside p50 in various cell types, including epithelial/endothelial cells and neuronal tissues.

Structure 

RELA is one member of the NF-κB family, one of the essential transcription factors under intensive study. Seven proteins encoded by five genes are involved in the NF-κB complex, namely p105, p100, p50, p52, RELA, c-REL and RELB. Like other proteins in this complex, RELA contains a N-terminal REL-homology domain (RHD), and also a C-terminal transactivation domain (TAD). RHD is involved in DNA binding, dimerization and NF-κB/REL inhibitor interaction. On the other hand, TAD is responsible for interacting with the basal transcription complex including many coactivators of transcription such as TBP, TFIIB and CREB-CBP. RELA and p50 is the mostly commonly found heterodimer complex among NF-κB homodimers and heterodimers, and is the functional component participating in nuclear translocation and activation of NF-κB.

RELA is a 65 kDa protein.

Phosphorylation 

Phosphorylation of RELA plays a key role in regulating NF-κB activation and function. Subsequent to NF-κB nuclear translocation, RELA undergoes site-specific post-translational modifications to further enhance the NF-κB function as a transcription factor. RELA can either be phosphorylated in the RHD region or the TAD region, attracting different interaction partners. Triggered by lipopolysaccharide (LPS), protein kinase A (PKA) specifically phosphorylates serine 276 in the RHD domain in the cytoplasm, controlling NF-κB DNA-binding and oligomerization. On the other hand, mitogen and stress-activated kinase 1 (MSK1) are also able to phosphorylate RELA at residue 276 under TNFα induction in the nucleus, increasing NF-κB response at the transcriptional level. Phosphorylation of serine 311 by protein kinase C zeta type (PKCζ) serves the same purpose.
Two residues in the TAD region are targeted by phosphorylation. After IL-1or TNFα stimulation, serine 529 is phosphorylated by casein kinase II (CKII), while serine 536 is phosphorylated by IκB kinases (IKKs). In response to DNA damage, ribosomal subunit kinase-1 (RSK1) also has the ability to phosphorylate RELA at serine 536 in a p53-dependent manner. A couple of other kinases are also able to phosphorylate RELA at different conditions, including glycogen-synthase kinase-3β (GSK3β), AKT/phosphatidylinositol 3-kinase (PI3K) and NF-κB activating kinase (NAK, i.e. TANK-binding kinase-1 (TBK1) and TRAF2-associated kinase (T2K)). The fact that RELA can be modified by a collection of kinases via phosphorylation at different sites/regions within the protein under different stimulations might suggest a synergistic effect of these modifications. 
Phosphorylation at these sites enhances NF-κB transcriptional response via tightened binding to transcription coactivators. For example, CBP and p300 binding to RELA are enhanced when serine 276 or 311 is phosphorylated.
Status of several phosphorylation sites determines RELA stability mediated by the ubiquitin-mediated proteolysis. Cell-type-specific phosphorylation is also observed for RELA. Multiple-site phosphorylation is common in endothelial cells, and different cell types may contain different stimuli, leading to targeted phosphorylation of RELA by different kinases. For instance, IKK2 is found to be mainly responsible for phosphorylating serine 536 in monocytes and macrophages, or in CD40 receptor binding in hepatic stellate cells. IKK1 functions as the major kinase phosphorylating serine 536 under different stimuli, such as the ligand activation of the lymphotoxin-β receptor (LTβR).

Acetylation 

In vivo studies revealed that RELA is also under acetylation modification in the nucleus, which is just as important as phosphorylation as a post-translational modification of proteins. 
Lysines 218, 221 and 310 are acetylation targets within RELA, and response to acetylation is site-specific. For instance, lysine 221 acetylation facilitates RELA dissociation from IκBα and enhances its DNA-binding affinity. Lysine 310 acetylation is indispensable for the full transcriptional activity of RELA, but does not affect its DNA-binding ability. Hypothesis about RELA acetylation suggests acetylation aids its subsequent recognition by transcriptional co-activators with bromodomains, which are specialized in recognizing acetylated lysine residues. Lysine 122 and 123 acetylation are found to be negatively correlated with RELA transcriptional activation. 
Unknown mechanisms mediate the acetylation of RELA possibly using p300/CBP and p300/CBP factor associated coactivators under TNFα or phorbol myristate acetate (PMF) stimulation both in vivo and in vitro. RELA is also under the control of deacetylation via HDAC, and HDAC3 is the mediator of this process both in vivo and in vitro.

Methylation 

Methylation of lysine 218 and 221 together or lysine 37 alone in the RHD domain of RELA can lead to increased response to cytokines such as IL-1 in mammalian cell culture.

Interactions 

As the prototypical heterodimer complex member of the NF-κB, together with p50, RELA/p65 interacts with various proteins in both the cytoplasm and in the nucleus during the process of classical NF-κB activation and nuclear translocation. In the inactive state, RELA/p50 complex is mainly sequestered by IκBα in the cytosol. TNFα, LPS and other factors serve as activation inducers, followed by phosphorylation at residue 32 and 36 of IκBα, leading to rapid degradation of IκBα via the ubiquitin-proteasomal system and subsequent release of RELA/p50 complex. RELA nuclear localization signal used to be sequestered by IκBα is now exposed, and rapid translocation of the NF-κB occurs. In parallel, there is a non-classical NF-κB activation pathway involving the proteolytic cleavage of p100 into p52 instead of p50. This process does not require RELA, hence will not be discussed in detail here. 
After NF-κB nuclear localization due to TNFα stimulation, p50/RELA heterodimer will function as a transcription factor and bind to a variety of genes involved in all kinds of biological processes, such as leukocyte activation/chemotaxis, negative regulation of TNFIKK pathway, cellular metabolism, antigen processing, just to name a few . 
Phosphorylation of RELA at different residues also enables its interaction with CDKs and P-TEFb. Phosphorylation at serine 276 in RELA allows its interaction with P-TEFb containing CDK9 and cyclin T1 subunits, and phospho-ser276 RELA-P-TEFb complex is necessary for IL-8 and Gro-β activation. Another mechanism is involved in the activation of genes preloaded with Pol II in a RELA serine 276 phosphorylation independent manner.

RELA has been shown to interact with:

 APBA2,
 AHR,
 ASCC3,
 BRCA1,
 BTRC,
 c-Fos,
 c-Jun,
 C22orf25,
 CDK9,
 CEBPB,
 CEBPE,
 CREBBP,
 CSNK2A1,
 CSNK2A2,
 DHX9,
 EP300,
 ETHE1,
 FUS,
 GCN5,
 HDAC1,
 HDAC2,
 HDAC3,
 ING4,
 IκBα,
 KLF5,
 MDM2,
 MEN1,
 MSK1,
 MTPN,
 NCF1,
 NFKB1,
 NFKB2,
 NFKBIB,
 NFKBIE,
 NR3C1,
 NCOR2,
 PARP1,
 PDLIM2,
 PIAS3,
 PIM1,
 PIN1,
 PKA,
 POU2F1,
 PPARG,
 PPP1R13L,
 PRKCZ,
 REL,
 RFC1,
 RNF25,
 SIRT1,
 SOCS1,
 SP1,
 STAT3,
 TAF4B,
 TBP, 
 TP53, and
 TRIB3.

Role in immune system 

Gene knockout of NF-κB genes via homologous recombination in mice showed the role of these components in innate and adaptive immune responses. RELA knockout mice is embryonic lethal due to liver apoptosis. Lymphocyte activation failure is also observed, suggesting that RELA is indispensable in the proper development of the immune system. In comparison, deletion of other REL-related genes will not cause embryonic development failure, though different levels of defects are also noted. The fact that cytokines such as TNFα and IL-1 can stimulate the activation of RELA also supports its participation in immune response. 
In general, RELA participates in adaptive immunity and responses to invading pathogens via NF-κB activation. Mice without individual NF-κB proteins are deficient in B- and T-cell activation and proliferation, cytokine production and isotype switching. Mutations in RELA is found responsible for inflammatory bowel disease as well.

Cancer 

NF-κB/RELA activation has been found to be correlated with cancer development, suggesting the potential of RELA as a cancer biomarker. Specific modification patterns of RELA have also been observed in many cancer types.

Prostate 

RELA may have a potential role as biomarker for prostate cancer progression and metastases, as suggested by the association found between RELA nuclear localization and prostate cancer aggressiveness and biochemical recurrence.

Thyroid 

Strong correlation between nuclear localization of RELA and clinicopathological parameters for papillary thyroid carcinoma (PTC), suggesting the role of NF-κB activation in tumor growth and aggressiveness in PTC. 
Other than usage as an biomarker, serine 536 phosphorylation in RELA is also correlated with nuclear translocation and the expression of some transactivating genes such as COX-2, IL-8 and GST-pi in follicular thyroid carcinomas via morphoproteomic analysis.

Leukemia 

Mutations in the transactivation domain of RELA can lead to decrease in transactivating ability and this mutation can be found in lymphoid neoplasia.

Head and neck 

Nuclear localization of NF-κB/RELA is positively correlated with tumor micrometastases into lymph and blood and negatively correlated with patient survival outcome in patients with head and neck squamous cell carcinoma (HNSCC). This suggests a role of NF-κB/RELA as a possible target for targeted-therapy.

Breast 

There is both a physical and a functional association between RELA and aryl hydrocarbon receptor (AhR), and the subsequent activation of c-myc gene transcription in breast cancer cells. Another paper reported interactions between estrogen receptor (ER) and NF-κB members, including p50 and RELA. It is shown that ERα interacts with both p50 and RELA in vitro and in vivo, and RELA antibody can reduce ERα:ERE complex formation. The paper claims a mutual repression between ER and NF-κB.

Monogenic Behçet’s Disease-like conditions 
Behçet's disease-like conditions are increasingly recognized and to date predominantly involve loss-of-function variants in TNFAIP3. However, a RELA mutation that results in truncated protein variant has been reported  to cause severe autoinflammatory disease due to impaired NF-κB signaling and increased apoptosis. The phenotypes associated with this disease include mucocutaneous ulcerative syndrome and neuromyelitis optica (NMO).

References

Further reading

External links 
 

Transcription factors